Tania Heald (born 28 May 1943) is a British alpine skier. She competed in two events at the 1964 Winter Olympics.

References

1943 births
Living people
British female alpine skiers
Olympic alpine skiers of Great Britain
Alpine skiers at the 1964 Winter Olympics
People from Virginia Water